Offering is the third studio album by the American hard rock band Axe, released by Atco Records in 1982.

Track listing 

 "Rock 'n' Roll Party in the Streets" (3:29)
 "Video Inspiration" (2:49)
 "Steal Another Fantasy" (4:41)
 "Jennifer" (3:57)
 "I Got the Fire" (Ronnie Montrose; Montrose cover) (3:19)
 "Burn the City Down" (4:46)
 "Now or Never" (3:51)
 "Holdin' On" (2:54)
 "Silent Soldiers" (6:01)

Personnel

 Bobby Barth – lead guitar, lead vocals
 Mike Osbourne – rhythm guitar, backing vocals
 Edgar Riley – keyboards, backing vocals
 Mike Turpin – bass
 Teddy Mueller – drums

Chart performance

Album

Singles

References

Axe (band) albums
1982 albums